Shelawadi  or Shelavadi is a panchayat town in the southern state of Karnataka, India. It is located in the Navalgund taluk of Dharwad district in Karnataka.

Demographics
As of the 2011 Census of India there were 1,366 households in Shelawadi and a total population of 6,933 consisting of 3,551 males and 3,382 females. There were 854 children ages 0-6.

Geography

The district is bounded on the North by the District of Belgaum, on the East by the district of Gadag, on the South Haveri and on the West by Uttara Kannada district. All these districts which surround Dharwad district belong to Karnataka State itself.

Sub Divisions of District (Taluka's)
 Dharwad
 Hubballi
 Kundgol
 Navalgund
 Kalghatgi

The District lies approximately 800 m above sea level, which is why it enjoys a moderate and healthy climate. The District may be divided into 3 natural regions, viz., the Malnad, Semi-Malnad and Maidan. These regions on an average receive moderate to heavy rainfall and have dense vegetation. Kalghatagi and Alnavar area in Dharwad taluka in particular receive more rainfall than other talukas of the District.

Transportation
By Road: Easy to reach from Gadag, Navalgund and Ron. State Highway 45 connects Arabhavi with Challakere via Gokak, Naragund, Shalavadi, Sirahatti, Mandaragi, Hadagali, Itagi, Ujjani and Jagalur pass through the village.
By Railway:Gadag Junction Railway Station Station are the nearest railheads.
By Air: via Hubli Airport.

See also
 Dharwad
 Districts of Karnataka

References

External links
 Dharwad
Navalgund Villages Map

Cities and towns in Dharwad district